Lesnaya Polyana is a rural locality (a settlement) in Sibirsky Selsoviet, Pervomaysky District, Altai Krai, Russia. The population was 351 as of 2013. There are five streets.

Geography 
Lesnaya Polyana is located 34 km north of Novoaltaysk (the district's administrative centre) by road. Lesopitomnik is the nearest rural locality.

References 

Rural localities in Pervomaysky District, Altai Krai